The 2003 Catalan regional election was held on Sunday, 16 November 2003, to elect the 7th Parliament of the autonomous community of Catalonia. All 135 seats in the Parliament were up for election.

This election marked a change for all Catalan political parties due to Catalan president Jordi Pujol's decision not to seek a seventh term in office and to retire from active politics. The election results were a great disappointment for Pasqual Maragall's Socialists' Party of Catalonia (PSC), which again saw Convergence and Union (CiU) winning a plurality of seats despite them winning the most votes by a margin of just 0.3%. Opinion polls earlier in the year had predicted a much larger victory for Maragall, but his lead over CiU had begun to narrow as the election grew nearer. Republican Left of Catalonia (ERC) was perceived as the true victor of the election, doubling its 1999 figures and scoring its best result in its recent history up to that point, both in terms of seats (23 of 135) and votes (16.4%), up from 11 seats and 8.7%.

As Pujol's successor Artur Mas did not win a majority large enough to renew his party pact with the People's Party (PP), which had kept Pujol in power since 1995, an alliance between the PSC, ERC and ICV–EUiA resulted in a Catalan "tripartite" government. Thus, despite losing 10 seats and 150,000 votes compared to the 1999 election, Maragall became the first centre-left president of the Government of Catalonia, ending with 23 uninterrupted years of CiU rule.

Overview

Electoral system
The Parliament of Catalonia was the devolved, unicameral legislature of the autonomous community of Catalonia, having legislative power in regional matters as defined by the Spanish Constitution of 1978 and the regional Statute of Autonomy, as well as the ability to vote confidence in or withdraw it from a regional president.

Transitory Provision Fourth of the Statute established a specific electoral procedure for elections to the Parliament of Catalonia, of application for as long as a specific law regulating the procedures for regional elections was not approved, to be supplemented by the provisions within the Organic Law of General Electoral Regime. Voting for the Parliament was on the basis of universal suffrage, which comprised all nationals over 18 years of age, registered in Catalonia and in full enjoyment of their political rights. The 135 members of the Parliament of Catalonia were elected using the D'Hondt method and a closed list proportional representation, with an electoral threshold of three percent of valid votes—which included blank ballots—being applied in each constituency. Seats were allocated to constituencies, corresponding to the provinces of Barcelona, Girona, Lleida and Tarragona, with each being allocated a fixed number of seats.

The use of the D'Hondt method might result in a higher effective threshold, depending on the district magnitude.

Election date
The term of the Parliament of Catalonia expired four years after the date of its previous election, unless it was dissolved earlier. The regional president was required to call an election fifteen days prior to the date of expiry of parliament, with election day taking place within sixty days after the call. The previous election was held on 17 October 1999, which meant that the legislature's term would have expired on 17 October 2003. The election was required to be called no later than 2 October 2003, with it taking place on the sixtieth day from the call, setting the latest possible election date for the Parliament on Monday, 1 December 2003.

The president had the prerogative to dissolve the Parliament of Catalonia and call a snap election, provided that no motion of no confidence was in process and that dissolution did not occur before one year had elapsed since a previous one under this procedure. In the event of an investiture process failing to elect a regional President within a two-month period from the first ballot, the Parliament was to be automatically dissolved and a fresh election called.

Background
In the 1999 election, and as a result of the Socialists' Party of Catalonia (PSC)'s growth, the Catalan nationalist Convergence and Union (CiU) had lost the vote share in a regional election for the first time ever, but clung on to retain the largest amount of seats due to the disproportionate allocation of seats in Girona, Lleida and Tarragona compared to Barcelona. Through to the support of the People's Party (PP), Jordi Pujol had been able to be re-elected to a sixth term in office with a slim majority of 68 to the 67 seats commanded by the left-from-centre opposition.

Despite Pujol's personal approval ratings remaining high until the end of his term, speculation on his possible retirement (which he confirmed on 1 April 2001), internal disputes between Democratic Convergence of Catalonia (CDC) and Democratic Union of Catalonia (UDC) over the future of the alliance—which resulted in CiU being turned into a full-fledged party federation in order to ensure its continuity in the post-Pujol era—and a desire for change after 23 years in power had resulted in CiU trailing the PSC in opinion polls for the entire legislature, with a lead that was nearly into the double digits by mid-to-late 2002. From mid-2003, however, the Socialist lead had begun to narrow to the point that chances for a possible reenactment of the 1999 tight race remained high. The retirement of Pujol as CiU candidate paved the way for Artur Mas, the then chief minister, to replace him as the culmination of a long successory process.

Republican Left of Catalonia (ERC) had been in an almost continuous growth since the 1988 election, becoming a political force able to pierce through the dominant two-party system in Catalonia. Initiative for Catalonia Greens (ICV) and United and Alternative Left (EUiA) had run separately in the previous election, but ahead of the 2003 election joined within the ICV–EA coalition.

Parliamentary composition
The Parliament of Catalonia was officially dissolved on 23 September 2003, after the publication of the dissolution decree in the Official Journal of the Government of Catalonia. The table below shows the composition of the parliamentary groups in the chamber at the time of dissolution.

Parties and candidates
The electoral law allowed for parties and federations registered in the interior ministry, coalitions and groupings of electors to present lists of candidates. Parties and federations intending to form a coalition ahead of an election were required to inform the relevant Electoral Commission within ten days of the election call, whereas groupings of electors needed to secure the signature of at least one percent of the electorate in the constituencies for which they sought election, disallowing electors from signing for more than one list of candidates.

Below is a list of the main parties and electoral alliances which contested the election:

Opinion polls
The tables below list opinion polling results in reverse chronological order, showing the most recent first and using the dates when the survey fieldwork was done, as opposed to the date of publication. Where the fieldwork dates are unknown, the date of publication is given instead. The highest percentage figure in each polling survey is displayed with its background shaded in the leading party's colour. If a tie ensues, this is applied to the figures with the highest percentages. The "Lead" column on the right shows the percentage-point difference between the parties with the highest percentages in a poll.

Graphical summary

Voting intention estimates
The table below lists weighted voting intention estimates. Refusals are generally excluded from the party vote percentages, while question wording and the treatment of "don't know" responses and those not intending to vote may vary between polling organisations. When available, seat projections determined by the polling organisations are displayed below (or in place of) the percentages in a smaller font; 68 seats were required for an absolute majority in the Parliament of Catalonia.

Results

Overall

Distribution by constituency

Aftermath

Notes

References
Opinion poll sources

Other

Catalonia
Regional elections in Catalonia
2003 in Catalonia
November 2003 events in Europe